The 1984 Utah State Aggies football team represented Utah State University during the 1984 NCAA Division I-A football season as a member of the Pacific Coast Athletic Association (PCAA). The Aggies were led by second-year head coach Chris Pella and played their home games at Romney Stadium in Logan, Utah. They finished the season with a record of one win and ten losses (1–10, 1–5 PCAA).

Schedule

References

Utah State
Utah State Aggies football seasons
Utah State Aggies football